Ȳ (minuscule: ȳ) is a letter of the Latin alphabet, formed from Y with the addition of a macron (¯).

In modern dictionaries and textbooks for Latin and Old English, ȳ may be used to indicate a long "y". In Latin, this only occurs in loanwords. It is also used in Livonian and Cornish.

Unicode

See also 
 U with macron (Cyrillic) (Ӯ, ӯ) - a similar looking character

Y-macron